Comins Township is a civil township of Oscoda County in the U.S. state of Michigan. The population was 1,970 at the 2010 census.

Communities
Also known as Biggs, the community had its own post office from December 12, 1891 until September 30, 1912.
The community began with a rural post office that opened on December 22, 1905 with Enos Frame serving as the first postmaster. The rural post office operated until September 30, 1912.

Geography

Major highways
  runs through the western portion of the township.
  runs through the township and concurrently with M-33 west of Fairview.
  runs briefly concurrently with M-33 along the western border of the township.

Demographics
As of the census of 2000, there were 2,017 people, 785 households, and 558 families residing in the township. There were 1,199 housing units at an average density of 17.0 per square mile (6.6/km2). The racial makeup of the township was 98.51% White, 0.10% African American, 0.69% Native American, 0.10% from other races, and 0.59% from two or more races. Hispanic or Latino of any race were 0.25% of the population.

There were 785 households, out of which 27.3% had children under the age of 18 living with them, 61.1% were married couples living together, 6.9% had a female householder with no husband present, and 28.9% were non-families. 25.7% of all households were made up of individuals, and 14.4% had someone living alone who was 65 years of age or older.  The average household size was 2.49 and the average family size was 2.98.

In the township the population was spread out, with 25.1% under the age of 18, 4.8% from 18 to 24, 20.9% from 25 to 44, 27.5% from 45 to 64, and 21.7% who were 65 years of age or older.  The median age was 44 years. For every 100 females, there were 86.9 males.  For every 100 females at the age of 18 and over, there were 86.3 males.

The median income for a household in the township was $28,750, and the median income for a family was $34,034. Males had a median income of $29,808 versus $19,886 for females. The per capita income for the township was $14,813.  About 7.9% of families and 13.2% of the population were below the poverty line, including 18.4% of those under age 18 and 10.8% of those age 65 or over.

See also
 Michigan AuSable Valley Railroad, headquartered in Fairview, operated from 1994–2017.

References

Sources

Townships in Oscoda County, Michigan
Townships in Michigan